Tone Mason is a Canadian hip-hop and R&B production team from Toronto, Ontario, composed of Mellenius, Don D, and formerly, Aloysius Brown. Tone Mason speaks to a deep-rooted dedication to craftsmanship, quality and originality. With over 15 years of experience in the music industry as a collective, they have contributed their eclectic brand of music to MuchMusic & MuchVibe (theme music for The Vibe, The Downlo), Barbershop: The Next Cut, BET, EA Sports, Russell Peters' Red, White and Brown and many more.

They also contributed their production skills and music to many major label-recording artists such as Drake, Jay-Z, Fantasia, Big Boi, Busta Rhymes, 50 Cent, Kardinal Offishall, Ice Cube, Common, Jeezy, Tory Lanez, Rick Ross and The Game. The group's production will give you diverse musical styles mixed with new flavours of today's growing fusion of pop music. Tone Mason's depth of music in pop culture ensures that they are here to stay.

History
Don D. began his career in the 1990s as a member of underground hip hop group Nefarius. He served as the group's DJ and producer. After the death of group member MC Kwesro in 1999, he and MC Collizhun (the other member) released an EP, Tough Dumplin' Foundation For Better Beats, before eventually parting ways. Before the fall of Nefarius, he met Aloysius Brown and Mellenius, and the three acted as "production protégés" for each other. Don D. thought it would be shameful for their material to go unheard, so they formed Tone Mason.

In 2003, the group produced "Back Where I've Stayed" for Choclair's Juno Award-winning album, Flagrant. They also produced Fantasia Barrino's hit single "Hood Boy" in 2006.

Discography

Singles
 "The Throwback" ft. BrassMunk, Graph Nobel and G-Stokes

Production credits
 "Stadium Music" - Lil Kim ft. Yo Gotti
 "The Color Purple" - Freddie Gibbs 
 "Double Up" - 50 Cent ft. Hayes
 "Light Up" – Drake ft. Jay-Z 
 "Hood Boy" – Fantasia ft. Big Boi
 "We Got the Streets" – Busta Rhymes ft. Papoose, Spliff Star, Labba, Reek da Villain, Rah Digga and Yummy Bingham
 "High Speed Chasin" – Rah Digga ft. Mobb Deep
 "Hot Like the Summer" – Saukrates ft. Andreena Mill			
 "Black Girl Pain" – Talib Kweli ft. Jean Grae and Yummy Bingham
 "My Girl" – Lloyd Banks
 "Magic Hour" – AZ ft. CL Smooth
 "Boom Bye Yeah" – Sean Price
 "Lil' Bro" – Ric-a-Che					
 "Fire in Ya Eyes" – JB ft. The Game		
 "Back Where I've Stayed" – Choclair
 "Filthy" – Rascalz							 	
 "A New Day" – Rochester 			
 "Struggle" – Eternia ft. Wordsworth and Kenn Starr
 "God Only Knows" – Point Blank
 "Salt n Pepper" – Saukrates ft. Rich Kidd
 "Time" – Theo 3
 "Blaow" – Frank n Dank ft. Lindo P
 "Reach" – Frankie Payne
 "Full Nelson" – Redman ft. Ready Roc, Runt Dawg and Saukrates
 "En La Noche" - Fito Blanko
 "Life" - The Game
 "What It Is" - Sheek Louch ft. Styles P (co-produced by C- Sharp)
 "For The People" - Ice Cube ft. Common
 "Let's Go" - Tassnata ft. Rich Kidd & Tona
 "Designated Driver" - Maestro ft. Skyzoo 
 "Day N Nite" - Kennedy Rd.
 "Like Them" - Jeezy ft. Rick Ross & Tory Lanez

Television and DVD appearances
 Theme/Lead Single for Barbershop: The Next Cut ("For The People" - Ice Cube ft. Common)
 Theme/Intro Music for MuchVibe (TV channel) and TV series
 Theme/Back Drop Music for The Score Television Network and Cabbie Unlimited
 Back Drop/Soundscape Music for BET's Iron Ring
 Back Drop/Soundscape Music for Russell Peters: Red, White, and Brown DVD Extras

References

External links
Tone Mason at SoundCloud
Tone Mason at Instagram
Tone Mason at Twitter
Tone Mason Official Website
Tone Mason at MySpace

Black Canadian musical groups
Musical groups established in 2002
Musical groups from Toronto
Canadian hip hop groups
Record production teams
2002 establishments in Ontario